The 1955 Soviet football championship was the 23rd seasons of competitive football in the Soviet Union and the 17th among teams of sports societies and factories. Dinamo Moscow won the championship becoming the Soviet domestic champions for the seventh time.

Honours

Notes = Number in parentheses is the times that club has won that honour. * indicates new record for competition

Soviet Union football championship

Class A

Class B

Group I

Group II

Top goalscorers

Class A
Eduard Streltsov (Torpedo Moscow) – 15 goals

References

External links
 1955 Soviet football championship. RSSSF